Horace Bancroft Davis (August 15, 1898- June 28, 1999) was an American left-wing journalist and academic. Davis was born in 1898 in Newport, Rhode Island and began studied at Harvard University prior to the outbreak of World War I. He refused to serve in the war and obtained conscientious objector status. Instead of fighting, he left Harvard and volunteered with the recently formed American Friends Service Committee. Returning to Harvard, he graduated with a B.A. in 1921 and went to work as a steelworker. Before returning to receive his Ph.D. Davis taught at Southwestern College in Memphis, Tennessee from 1929 to 1930 and then wrote for the labor news agency Federated Press before returning to school. In 1934, he graduated from Columbia University with a Ph.D.

Leaving Columbia for Brazil, Davis moved to Sao Paulo from 1933 to 1934 and taught at the Fundação Escola de Sociologia e Política, which later became part of the University of Sao Paulo before returning to the United States. He joined the faculty at Simmons College in Boston from 1936 to 1941. During World War II, he conducted research on behalf of the Congress of Industrial Organizations. In 1947, Davis was hired as an associate professor of economics at University of Missouri–Kansas City. Six years later in 1953, the anti-communist House Un-American Activities Committee subpoenaed Davis to testify because of suspected membership in Communist Party USA. He refused to testify and cited his Fifth Amendment right against self-incrimination. However, he was then fired by UMKC and blacklisted. From 1955 to 1957, he began teaching at historically-black Benedict College in South Carolina. In 1963, Davis was hired at the newly founded University of Guyana, where he stayed until 1966 and eventually became a dean. He retired from academia in 1968 but continued publishing work until 1978.

Davis' son, Horace Chandler Davis, was born in 1926 and became a leading mathematician. Like his father, he also refused to testify when called before HUAC and spent six months in prison.

He died shortly before his 101st birthday on June 28, 1999, at Illinois Masonic Medical Center.

Publications
 The Condition of Labor in the American Iron and Steel Industry [i.e., Labor and Steel] (based on the author's Columbia University Ph.D. thesis), International Publishers, 1933.
 Labor and Steel, International Publishers, 1933.
 NRA: Fascismo e communismo, Edicoes Nosso Livro, 1934.
 Shoes: The Workers and the Industry, International Publishers, 1940.
 Nationalism & Socialism: Marxist and Labor Theories of Nationalism to 1917, Monthly Review, 1967.
 (Editor and translator) Rosa Luxemburg, The National Question: Selected Writings, Monthly Review Press, 1976.
 Towards a Marxist Theory of Nationalism, Monthly Review Press, 1978.

References

1898 births
1999 deaths
People from Newport, Rhode Island
People from Chicago
American centenarians
Men centenarians
American conscientious objectors
American expatriates in Brazil
American expatriates in Guyana
20th-century American journalists
American male journalists
Economists from Illinois
Marxian economists
Harvard University alumni
Columbia University alumni
Rhodes College faculty
Academic staff of the University of São Paulo
Simmons University faculty
University of Missouri–Kansas City faculty
Benedict College faculty
Academic staff of the University of Guyana
Victims of McCarthyism
Members of the Communist Party USA
Writers from Rhode Island
20th-century American economists
Economists from Rhode Island